Echternach is a canton in the east of Luxembourg. Its capital is Echternach.

Administrative divisions
Echternach Canton consists of the following seven communes:

 Beaufort
 Bech
 Berdorf
 Consdorf
 Echternach
 Rosport-Mompach
 Waldbillig

Mergers
 On 1 January 2018 the former communes of Rosport and Mompach were merged to create the commune of Rosport-Mompach.  The law creating Rosport-Mompach was passed on 24 May 2011.

Population

See also
Little Switzerland, a nickname given to this area of Luxembourg.

References

 
Cantons of Luxembourg